The national flag of Croatia or The Tricolour is one of the state symbols of Croatia. It consists of three equal size, horizontal stripes in colours red, white and blue. In the middle is the coat of arms of Croatia.

History
The flag combines the colours of the flags of the Kingdom of Croatia (red and white), the Kingdom of Slavonia (blue and white) and partially of the Kingdom of Dalmatia (blue and yellow).

The red-white-blue tricolour has been used as the Croatian flag since 1848, and the pan-Slavic colours are widely associated with romantic nationalism. 
While the Banovina of Croatia existed within the Kingdom of Yugoslavia, it had a similar flag without the modern crown above the chequy.  After the Kingdom of Yugoslavia was invaded and Croatia became the Independent State of Croatia, the crown was removed and a "U" was placed at the top left of the flag.  Also, the first field of the Croatian chequy was white.  After Nazi Germany collapsed and the SFR Yugoslavia was created, Croatia's flag had a five-pointed red star with a yellow border in place of the coat of arms. The star was replaced by the coat of arms in May 1990, shortly after the first multiparty elections. The current flag and the coat of arms were officially adopted on 21 December 1990, about ten months before the proclamation of independence from Yugoslavia and a day before the Constitution of Croatia on 22 December 1990.

Shield
The shield is in the red and white checks of Croatia. Above is a crown made of shields of its various regions. From left to right they are the ancient arms of Croatia, Dubrovnik, Dalmatia, Istria and Slavonia.

Colours 

The following colours are specified for use in the flag:

Unicode

Historical flags

Other official flags in Croatia

Naval and other official flags

Gallery

See also 
List of Croatian flags
Coat of arms of Croatia
Flag of Yugoslavia
Flag of the Netherlands
Flag of Paraguay

References

External links

Everything about the Croatian flags
History of the Croatian Flag in brief
Historical Flags (1848-1918)

 
Croatia
National symbols of Croatia
Croatia
Croatia